The 2023 UC Davis football team will represent the University of California, Davis as a member of the Big Sky Conference during the 2023 NCAA Division I FCS football season. Led by seventh-year head coach Dan Hawkins, the Aggies play their home games at UC Davis Health Stadium in Davis, California.

Previous season

The Aggies finished the 2022 season with an overall record of 6–5 and a mark of 5–3 in conference play to place fifth in the Big Sky.

Schedule

References

UC Davis
UC Davis Aggies football seasons
UC Davis Aggies football